Belizean–Venezuelan relations are the bilateral relations between Belize and Venezuela.

History 

Belize and Venezuela established diplomatic relations on 25 April 1989.

See also 

 Foreign relations of Belize
 Foreign relations of Venezuela

References